In cellular automata such as Conway's Game of Life, a reflector is a pattern that can interact with a spaceship to change its direction of motion, without damage to the reflector pattern. In Life, many oscillators can reflect the glider; there also exist stable reflectors composed of still life patterns that, when they interact with a glider, reflect the glider and return to their stable state.

External links
New stable 180-degree glider reflector, Game of Life News, May 30, 2009
New stable 90-degree glider reflector, Game of Life News, May 29, 2013

Cellular automaton patterns